The Priory of Vrana was a monastery near the Croatian town Vrana established as priory of Templars by the Hungarian king Béla II at the beginning of the 12th century. At the beginning of the 14th century the Hungarian perceptories of the Order of Hospitallers took over control of the monastery and established it as their priory.

History

Background 
In 1076, Croatian King Demetrius Zvonimir granted the monastery of St. Gregory in Vrana to Pope Gregory VII. The monastery was used as a residence for papal legates visiting Croatia. In the 12th century, the Knights Hospitaller and the Templars had a significant influence in the Kingdom of Croatia. The Templars established the "province of Hungary and Slavonia" in the 1160s, which covered Croatia and the Kingdom of Hungary. Around this period, the Templars gained the Vrana monastery. According to historian Angelo de Benvenuti, it was Hungarian King Béla II who established two Templar priories, the Priory of Bela, in the town of Bela near Varaždin, and the Priory of Vrana which was subordinated to the former. The historian Josip Kolanović considered that it was the Holy See that gave Vrana to the Templars.

The Hungarian, and later Hungarian-Slavonian priory, was not autonomous langue. Until middle of 13th century and since first third of the 14th century the Italian grand prior was in charge for its affairs, although in many cases it was counted as one of the German "provinces".

The head of priory was equal to the bishops in hierarchy of the order and entitled to permanent seat in the royal council and in the House of Lords. The seat of the priory was in a short period in the Dalmatian town Vrana. After the town fell into Venetian hands in 1409, the priory had nothing to do with Vrana and all of its estates were limited to Hungarian territory.

Templar monastery 
Vrana monastery was the most important possession of Templars in the whole region. The templars improved defence of the monastery by improving its existing fortifications. They expanded its possessions in Dalmatia and Croatia.

Since middle of the 13th century the Hungarian priories of the Knights Hospitalers suffered many blows to their strength. The severe blow to their strength was anarchy in period at the turn of 13th and 14th century. After the Chinon Parchment in 1308 and Vox in excelso in 1312 the houses and other property of Templars were transferred to the Knight Hospitalers, including the Priory of Vrana, which gained a predominant role among Hungarian priories.

Under control of Hungarian Knights Hospitalers 
After taking the priory of Vrana from Templars, the Hungarian perceptories of the Order of Hospitallers established it as their priory.

Around 1380, when the Western Schism began, Hungarian king Louis I of Hungary appointed Croatian knight John of Palisna, as prior of Vrana. Since this appointment the King of Hungary appointed all succeeding priors of Vrana. Palisna bear the title of the "Hungarian-Slavonian prior" since 1379 although he was officially appointed as prior only in 1382.

The Order of Knights Hospitaller was among the major landowners in the Kingdom of Hungary. On the account of the income from estates given to the priory, the prior was obliged to participate and support the Hungarian king in wars. John of Palisna has participated in the Battle of Kosovo in 1389.

During the 15th century all priories of Vrana were Hungarian noblemen, not knights but secular persons, appointed for a lifetime. At the end of 15th century the priory collected taxes from more than 2,400 households in the territory of Csurgo, Karaševo, Božjakovina, Pakrac, Čaklovac, Lešnik, Rasošja, Trnava, Dubica, Gradačac and many other.

Under the Ottoman control 
The heart of 1596 plans for the uprising in the eastern Adriatic region was Francesco Antonio Bertucci. According to some suggestions, the main reason for his anti-Ottoman activities were his plans to recapture the Priory of Vrana from the Ottomans. According to Bertucci's plan, the rebels (including Uskoks) would first capture Klis, Herceg Novi and Scutari from the Ottomans. That would trigger a large Ottoman naval expedition on the Adriatic northwards and draw the Venetians, who otherwise refused to join the crusade, to join the alliance against the Ottomans. This plan started with the Battle of Klis in 1596 which ended with brief capture and looting of the Klis and priory.

List of priors and other officials

Twelfth–thirteenth century

Fourteenth century

References

Sources 

 
 

 
 
 
 
 

Knights Hospitaller
History of Christianity in Hungary